Inha Law School is one of the professional graduate schools of Inha University, located in Incheon, South Korea. Founded in 2009, it is one of the founding law schools in South Korea and is one of the smaller schools with each class in the three-year J.D. program having approximately 50 students.

References

External links 
 

Universities and colleges in Incheon
Law schools in South Korea
2009 establishments in South Korea
Educational institutions established in 2009
Inha University

ko:인하대학교 법학전문대학원